Ian Morris (born 27 June 1946 in Maesteg) is a Welsh former cricketer active from 1966 to 1968 who played for Glamorgan. He appeared in 14 first-class matches as a righthanded batsman who bowled slow left-arm orthodox spin. He scored 253 runs with a highest score of 38 (against Hampshire 1966)
and took four wickets with a best performance of two for 30.

Notes

1946 births
Welsh cricketers
Glamorgan cricketers
Living people